I Wish You Would may refer to:

"I Wish You Would" (Billy Boy Arnold song)
"I Wish You Would" (DJ Khaled song)
"I Wish You Would", a song by Taylor Swift from her album 1989
"I Wish You Would", a song by Train from their album Drops of Jupiter
I Wish You Would (album), a 1979 one-off recording project of John Wetton, Richard Palmer-James, John Hutcheson, and Curt Cress
"I Wish You Would", a song by Dutch DJ and producer Martijn ten Velden.

See also
"Wish You Would", a song by Ludacris